The Greenland Guide and Scout Association is the youngest of the Danish Scout associations, founded on February 2, 1973. Previously Greenlandic boys had belonged to one of the Danish Scout associations and girls belonged to one of the corresponding Danish Guide associations. Scouting in Greenland started in 1943, and Guiding began in 1950. Greenland Guide and Scout Association, however, is a coeducational organization, and has been recognized as an associate member of the Fællesrådet for Danmarks Drengespejdere since 1976 and of the Pigespejdernes Fællesråd Danmark since 1981. Initial grants from the Parliament of Greenland helped the fledgling organization. Today, the association has about 500 members.

The association focuses upon local conditions, skills and handicrafts, sea and mountaineering activities and subzero camping, as well as nature conservation, of particular importance on the Arctic island. The limited means of public transport render a camp for all members impracticable, so camps are instead arranged at district level. The membership badge of the association incorporates elements of the coat of arms of Greenland.

See also 

 Scouting and Guiding in Newfoundland and Labrador

External links
 Scouting 'Round the World, World Scout Bureau, Geneva, Switzerland, 1977

Sports organisations of Greenland
Overseas branches of Scouting and Guiding associations
World Association of Girl Guides and Girl Scouts member organizations
World Organization of the Scout Movement member organizations
Scouting and Guiding in Denmark
Youth organizations established in 1973
1973 establishments in Greenland